Zyon McCollum (born May 3, 1999) is an American football cornerback for the Tampa Bay Buccaneers of the National Football League (NFL). He previously played college football at Sam Houston State before being selected by the Buccaneers in the fifth round of the 2022 NFL Draft.

Early life and high school
McCollum grew up in Galveston, Texas and attended Ball High School. He initially committed to play college football at Utah alongside his twin brother, Tristin. He and his brother later decommitted and signed letters of intent to play at Sam Houston State, citing a desire to play closer to home.

College career
McCollum became a starter at cornerback during his freshman season. He was named first-team All-Southland Conference after recording 44 tackles with eight passes broken up and three interceptions in his sophomore season. McCollum was named second-team All-Conference as a junior after intercepting three passes and breaking up 11 despite missing the final three games of the season due injury. He had 46 tackles and was a first-team All-Southland during his senior season, which was shortened and played in the spring of 2021 due to the COVID-19 pandemic in the United States, as the Bearkats won the 2021 NCAA Division I Football Championship Game. McCollum decided to utilize the extra year of eligibility granted to college athletes who played in the 2020 season due to the coronavirus pandemic and return to Sam Houston State for a fifth season. In his final season, he had 50 tackles, two tackles for loss, three interceptions, and eight passes defended and was named first-team All-Western Athletic Conference.

Professional career

McCollum was selected by the Tampa Bay Buccaneers in the fifth round of the 2022 NFL Draft.

References

External links
 Tampa Bay Buccaneers bio
Sam Houston State Bearkats bio

1999 births
Living people
Players of American football from Texas
American football cornerbacks
Sam Houston Bearkats football players
Sportspeople from Galveston, Texas
Tampa Bay Buccaneers players